Howland Dam may refer to:
Howland Dam (Maine), in Howland, Penobscot County
Howland Dam (Vermont), in Windsor County
Howland Dam (Hudson), on the Hudson River, Saratoga County, New York above Mechanicville